Orthomecyna mesochasma is a moth of the family Crambidae. It is endemic to the Hawaiian island of Kauai.

External links

Crambinae
Endemic moths of Hawaii